Greek National Road 87 (EO87) is a National Road in East Attica, Greece.

Route
According to the Government Gazette in 1963, the EO87 is a spur of EO54 from Pallini to Spata.

Citations

Further information

87
Roads in Attica